Jatta is a 2013 Indian Kannada-language thriller drama film directed by B. M. Giriraj. It stars Kishore and Sukrutha Wagle in lead roles. Kishore plays the role of a forest guard whose wife elopes with a tourist and he becomes involved in a clash of beliefs and ideologies with a feminist who he chains in his isolated forest home. The film won critical acclaim for its story and the portrayal of characters from critics and filmgoers. The film is an inspiration from Hollywood movie "Black Snake Moan" (2006).

Cast
 Kishore as Jatta
 Sukrutha Wagle as Sagarika
 Paavana Gowda as Belli
 Prem Kumar as Bheemakumar
 B. Suresha
 Vinod Kumbar as Rajesh

Production
In 2010, B. M. Giriraj made an experimental film Naviladavaru with a budget of 35,000. Being recognized for this, he was offered to direct Advaita by film producer N. M. Suresh in the same year, a film that did not release. He was then offered Jatta by producer N. S. Rajkumar.

Soundtrack
The music of the film was composed by the duo Ashley Mendonca and Abhilash Lakra with lyrics penned by B. M. Giriraj.

Track list

Reception
Jatta received largely positive response from critics upon its release. G. S. Kumar of The Times of India gave the film a four star rating out of five and wrote, "Full marks to director BM Giriraj who has worked wonders with a story that captures human values, conflicts, dilemmas and tries to find a solution to them. With a good script and excellent narration, the director has made the movie interesting not only for the class but also for the mass audience." Shyam Prasad. S of Bangalore Mirror gave the film a 4.5/5 rating and wrote, "With just a handful of characters, Jatta dabbles with and intertwines various topics like feminism, male chauvinism, religious intolerance, adultery, Ambedkar-isms, corruption and cultural beliefs; all of which are dealt with in a simple yet engrossing narrative." He concluded by praising the role of all the departments in the film including directing, acting, cinematography and music.

References

External links
 

2013 films
2010s Kannada-language films
2013 thriller drama films
2013 drama films
Indian thriller drama films
Films directed by B. M. Giriraj